The Islander 40 is an American  sailboat that was designed by Doug Peterson as a racer-cruiser and first built in 1979.

Production
The design was built by Islander Yachts in the United States starting in 1979, but it is now out of production.

Design
The Islander 40 is a recreational keelboat, built predominantly of fiberglass with a Divinycell (cross-linked PVC foam core) deck and oiled teak trim. It has a masthead sloop rig with aluminum spars, a raked stem, a raised reverse transom, an internally mounted spade-type rudder controlled by a wheel and a fixed fin keel. It displaces  and carries  of lead ballast.

Shoal draft models were normally fitted with a shorter rig.

The design has sleeping accommodation for six people. There is a private bow cabin with a "V"-berth, an aft cabin under the cockpit with a quarter berth and two settee berths in the main cabin, along with a pilot berth above on the port side. The galley is located at the foot of the companionway steps on the port side and features a three-burner, propane-fired stove and an oven. Both pressurized water and foot-pump water is available. The navigation station is located on the starboard side, opposite the galley. The head is located just aft of the bow cabin, on the port side and includes a shower with a teak grating over the sump.

Ventilation is provided by six opening ports, with opening hatches over the bow cabin and the main cabin.

For sailing there is a mainsheet traveler on the coach house roof. There are two winches for the jib in the cockpit and winches for the mainsail and jib halyards. All sheets and halyards lead to the cockpit or the aft part of the coach house roof. Secondary winches and a baby stay were factory options. The boat is equipped with a topping lift, internally- mounted outhaul and reefing.

The design has a PHRF racing average handicap of 82.

See also
List of sailing boat types

Similar sailboats
Baltic 40
Bayfield 40
Bermuda 40
Bristol 39
Bristol 40
Cal 39
Cal 39 Mark II
Cal 39 (Hunt/O'Day)
Caliber 40
Corbin 39
Dickerson 41
Endeavour 40
Freedom 39
Freedom 39 PH
Lord Nelson 41
Nautical 39
Nordic 40

References

Keelboats
1970s sailboat type designs
Sailing yachts
Sailboat type designs by Doug Peterson
Sailboat types built by Islander Yachts